Bilgin Defterli (born 1 November 1980) is a Turkish women's football forward currently playing in the 2. Frauen-Bundesliga for Alemannia Aachen in Germany with jersey number 9. She has been a member of the Turkey women's national football team since 1999 and serves as their captain.

Early life
Defterli was born on November 1, 1980, in Erzurum, Turkey. She was the youngest of six children, four girls and two boys. Between 1991 and 1996, she participated in several sports, winning five titles and two second places. She enjoyed football, playing with boys in the neighborhood and competing on the school boys' team that took part in tournaments. Her secondary school physical education teacher noticed Defterli's talent and convinced her parents that she had a football playing future. Defterli entered the women's football club Istanbul Dinarsu Spor in 1996.

Playing career

Club

In Turkey

At Istanbul Dinarsu Spor, she played and experienced championships in the Turkish Women's First Football League. Defterli was loaned out then to Feriköy SK, where she won a championship in the Second League and helped her team to get promoted to the First League. That season, she was honored with the title Top Scorer for her 29 goals in 20 league matches. In the 2000 season with Delta Mobilyaspor, Defterli finished with another league championship and her second Top Scorer title. The following year she was with Kuzeyspor, where she earned a First League championship once again. After playing one year on loan at Hatay Sanayispor, she returned home to Istanbul and learned that the women's football leagues in Turkey would be dissolved.

In Germany
Seeing no chance to play football in Turkey due to the dissolution of women's football leagues in 2003, she decided to go abroad. She applied to women's football clubs around Frankfurt in Germany, where her uncle was living. She received an invitation from FSV Frankfurt to take part in trainings limited to one month. In 2004, the Turkish women's national football player was accepted to join the squad of FSV Frankfurt. Lacking knowledge of any foreign language, Defterli did not have an easy time there in the beginning. She transferred to FFC Brauweiler Pulheim the next season, where she scored 28 goals in 24 matches. Her club disbanded in 2009 and she joined 1. FC Köln. The club competes in the German Regionalliga West. Scoring 22 goals in 20 league matches in her first year with 1. FC Köln, she was awarded the title Top Scorer for the third time in her career, and became the first foreign player honored with this title in the "2. Fußball-Bundesliga für Frauen". In June 2013, she extended her contract with 1. FC Köln.

After playing five years for 1. FC Köln, Defterli transferred to Alemannia Aachen in July 2014, which was recently promoted to the 2. Fußball-Bundesliga für Frauen.

Bilgin Defterli is nicknamed Billy by her fans in Germany. She is known for turning a somersault on the field after scoring a goal.

International

Defterli made her national-team debut in the UEFA Women's Euro 2001 qualifying match against the Greek team, which was held on December 18, 1999, in Karditsa, Greece.

At the 2003 FIFA World Cup qualification (UEFA) – Group 8 round, she scored a goal against both Bosnia and Herzegovina and Hungary. Defterli netted two of the nine goals scored against the Georgian women's team at the UEFA Women's Euro 2009 qualifying in 2006. At UEFA Support International Tournament matches between 2007 and 2009, she scored a total of seven goals. She scored goals in the 2011 FIFA Women's World Cup qualification – UEFA Group 5 matches against both Malta and Austria. Defterli netted a goal in the friendly game against Greece on April 29, 2011. At the UEFA Women's Euro 2013 qualifying – Group 2 match against the Romanian team, which the Turkish women lost 1–7, she scored the only goal for her country.

Honors

Individual
 Top Scorer 1998–99 – Turkish Women's Second Football League with Feriköy SK 
 Top Scorer 1999–2000 – Turkish Women's First Football League with Delta Mobilyaspor 
 Top Scorer 2009–10 – 2. Fußball-Bundesliga für Frauen, Group South with 1. FC Köln

References

External links
 

1980 births
Sportspeople from Erzurum
Living people
Turkish women's footballers
Turkish expatriate sportspeople in Germany
FSV Frankfurt (women) players
1. FC Köln players
Women's association football forwards
Turkey women's international footballers
Alemannia Aachen players
Expatriate women's footballers in Germany
Dinarsuspor players
Turkish expatriate women's footballers